WKDE-FM is a Classic Country formatted broadcast radio station licensed to Altavista, Virginia, serving Altavista, Bedford, and Lynchburg in Virginia.  WKDE-FM is owned and operated by D.J. Broadcasting, Inc.

References

External links
 105-5 KD Country Online
 

1969 establishments in Virginia
KDE-FM
Radio stations established in 1969